Tsamba-Magotsi  is a department of Ngounié Province in southern Gabon. The capital lies at Fougamou. It had a population of 14,875 in 2013.

Towns and villages
Guidouma

References

Ngounié Province
Departments of Gabon